Radim Řezník (born 20 January 1989) is a Czech footballer who plays for Viktoria Plzeň.

Řezník started his league career at FC Baník Ostrava, where he played until 2011, when he moved to FC Viktoria Plzeň.

He has also played for the Czech youth national teams since the under-16 level. He is a member of the Czech under-21 team. He represented the team at the 2011 UEFA European Under-21 Football Championship.

Career statistics 
As of 30 December 2014

Honours

Club
Viktoria Plzeň
 Czech First League: 2012–13

References

External links
 
 
 Profile at FC Banik Ostrava

1989 births
Living people
People from Český Těšín
Association football fullbacks
Czech footballers
Czech Republic youth international footballers
Czech Republic under-21 international footballers
Czech First League players
FC Baník Ostrava players
FC Viktoria Plzeň players
Czech Republic international footballers
FK Mladá Boleslav players
Sportspeople from the Moravian-Silesian Region